Kurilo Point (‘Nos Kurilo’ \'nos ku-'ri-lo\) is a sharp ice-free point on the southeast coast of Snow Island in the South Shetland Islands, Antarctica projecting 200 m into Bransfield Strait.  Situated 3.1 km southwest of President Head and 2.3 km north of Hall Peninsula.

The point is named after the settlement of Kurilo in western Bulgaria.

Location
Bulgarian mapping in 2009.

Map
 L.L. Ivanov. Antarctica: Livingston Island and Greenwich, Robert, Snow and Smith Islands. Scale 1:120000 topographic map.  Troyan: Manfred Wörner Foundation, 2009.

References
 Kurilo Point. SCAR Composite Gazetteer of Antarctica.
 Bulgarian Antarctic Gazetteer. Antarctic Place-names Commission. (details in Bulgarian, basic data in English)

External links
 Kurilo Point. Copernix satellite image

Headlands of the South Shetland Islands
Bulgaria and the Antarctic